The Constitution of Zimbabwe is the supreme law of Zimbabwe. The independence constitution of 1980 was the result of the 1979 Lancaster House Agreement and is sometimes called the Lancaster Constitution. A proposed constitution, drafted by a  constitutional convention, was defeated by a constitutional referendum during 2000.

In practice, the 2008 power-sharing deal provided the structure for much of the government.  The three political parties in Zimbabwe, ZANU-PF, MDC-T and MDC-N negotiated a new proposed constitution after a constitutional outreach program.  The new constitution was approved in the referendum of 16 March 2013. The parliament approved it on 9 May 2013. Some of the new constitution's clauses do not take effect for 10 years.

Presidential succession
Sch 6, par 14 of the Constitution states: -
"Special provision for election and tenure of first President and appointment of Vice-Presidents"
"...[C]andidates for election as President do not nominate persons ... to stand for election as Vice-Presidents."
"Without delay the person elected as President ... must appoint not more than two Vice-Presidents, who hold office at his or her pleasure." - in other words, the President can dismiss the Vice-Presidents.
"Where--
a. one Vice-President is appointed in terms of subparagraph (2), that person is the first Vice-President for the purposes of this Constitution;
b. two Vice-Presidents are appointed in terms of subparagraph (2), the President may from time to time nominate one of them to act as President whenever he or she is absent from Zimbabwe or is unable exercise his or her official functions through illness or any other cause."
"...[S]ubject to subparagraphs (5) and (6), if the person elected President ... dies, resigns or is removed from office--
a. the Vice-President or, where there are two Vice-Presidents, the Vice-President who was last nominated to act in terms of subparagraph (3)(b), acts as President until a new President assumes office in terms of subparagraph (5); and
b. the vacancy in the office of President must be filled by a nominee of the political party which the President represented when he or she stood for election.
"A political party which is entitled to nominate a person in terms of subparagraph (4)(b) must notify the Speaker of the nominee's name within ninety days after the vacancy occurred in the office of President, and thereupon the nominee assumes office as President after taking the oath of President ..., which oath the nominee must take within forty-eight hours after the Speaker was notified of his or her name."
Section 97 of the Constitution states (NB references to Vice-Presidents omitted, as they currently serve at the President's pleasure): - 
"Removal of President ... from office
 "The Senate and the National Assembly, by a joint resolution passed by at least one-half of their total membership, may resolve that the question whether or not the President ... should be removed from office for—
(a) serious misconduct;
(b) failure to obey, uphold or defend this Constitution;
(c) wilful violation of this Constitution; or
(d) inability to perform the functions of the office because of physical or mental incapacity; should be investigated in terms of this section."
 "Upon the passing of a resolution in terms of subsection (1), the Committee on Standing Rules and Orders must appoint a joint committee of the Senate and the National Assembly consisting of nine members reflecting the political composition of Parliament, to investigate the removal from office of the President ..."
 "If—
(a) the joint committee appointed in terms of subsection (2) recommends the removal from office of the President ...; and
(b) the Senate and the National Assembly, by a joint resolution passed by at least two-thirds of their total membership, resolve that the President ... should be removed from office; the President ... thereupon ceases to hold office."

References

Further reading

External links
2013 Constitution - Constitution Project 
2013 Constitution - Zimbabwe Legal Information Institute 

Zimbabwe
Constitution of Zimbabwe